Dade Moeller (February 27, 1927 – September 26, 2011) was an internationally known expert in radiation safety and environmental protection.

Life
Dade William Moeller, Ph.D., CHP, P.E. was born in 1927 in Grant, Florida a fishing community located on the intracoastal waterway near the Atlantic Ocean. His father was Robert A. Moeller and his mother was Victoria Moeller and he had 4 brothers, Charles E. Moeller, Robert L. Moeller, John A. Moeller, and Ken L. Moeller. In 1949 he married Betty Jean Radford 'Jeanie' of Decatur, Georgia. Moeller died at home from complications due to malignant lymphoma on September 26, 2011.

Military service and education
He passed the V-12 Navy College Training Program, and joined the U.S. Navy in 1944. Moeller attended Georgia Tech and graduated magna cum laude with a Bachelor of Science degree in Civil Engineering in 1947 and a Master of Science degree in Environmental Engineering in 1948. After graduating, Dade became a commissioned officer in the U.S. Public Health Service, with assignments that included Oak Ridge National Laboratory, Los Alamos National Laboratory, and the Headquarters office in Washington, D.C.

In 1957 with sponsorship from the U.S. Public Health Service, Moeller earned the Doctor of Philosophy degree in Nuclear Engineering from North Carolina State University. He taught radiation protection courses at the U.S. Public Health Service's Radiological Health Training Center in Cincinnati, Ohio. 
In 1959 Moeller joined the Health Physics Society and became a Certified Health Physicist and a Certified Environmental Engineer.
In 1961 Moeller became the Officer in Charge at the Northeastern Radiological Health Laboratory in Winchester, Massachusetts and studied radioactive fallout from atomic weapons testing and monitored children's thyroids for the uptake of radioactive iodine. 
In 1966 Moeller retired from the U.S. Public Health Service.

Harvard School of Public Health
Moeller held tenure for 26 years and served as:
Professor of Engineering in Environmental Health
Associate Director of the Kresge Center for Environmental Health
Associate Director of the Harvard-National Institute of Environmental Health Sciences Center for Environmental Health
Chairman of the Department of Environmental Health Sciences
Associate Dean for Continuing Education
Taught in the Center for Continuing Professional Education

Memberships
American Association for the Advancement of Science
American Industrial Hygiene Association
American Nuclear Society
American Public Health Association
Health Physics Society

Awards and honors
Health Physics Society, Fellow, 1968
National Academy of Engineering, Fellow, 1978
American Public Health Association, Fellow, 1988
American Nuclear Society, Fellow, 1988
U.S. Nuclear Regulatory Commission, Meritorious Achievement Award, 1988
National Council on Radiological Protection and Measurements, Distinguished Emeritus Member, 1997
Georgia Institute of Technology, Engineering Hall of Fame, 1999
NC State University, Distinguished Engineering Alumni Award, 2001
Health Physics Society, Robley D. Evans Commemorative Medal, 2003
William McAdams Outstanding Service Award, American Academy of Health Physics, 2005
Professor Emeritus Award of Merit, Harvard University School of Public Health, 2006

Patents
Method and apparatus for reduction of radon decay product exposure.
Radon decay product removal unit as adapted for use with a lamp.

Select publications

Thesis
Radionuclides in Reactor Cooling Water-Identification, Source and Control. (1957).

References

1927 births
2011 deaths
United States Navy officers
United States Public Health Service Commissioned Corps officers
United States Navy personnel of World War II
Georgia Tech alumni
People from Grant, Florida
North Carolina State University alumni
Health physicists
American civil engineers
Environmental engineers
Oak Ridge National Laboratory people
Harvard School of Public Health faculty
Los Alamos National Laboratory personnel
Health Physics Society
American nuclear engineers
Scientists from Florida
21st-century American engineers
20th-century American engineers
Deaths from lymphoma
Deaths from cancer in North Carolina